Mount Wegener is a mountain rising to 1,385 m in central Read Mountains, Shackleton Range. The feature was photographed from the air by the U.S. Navy in 1967 and was surveyed by the British Antarctic Survey (BAS) from 1968 to 1971. It was named by the United Kingdom Antarctic Place-Names Committee (UK-APC) in association with the names of geologists grouped in this area after Alfred L. Wegener (1880–1930), a German astronomer, meteorologist, Arctic explorer, and a pioneer of the theory of continental drift. Wegener was a professor of geophysics and meteorology at the University of Graz in Austria between 1924–30 and was the leader of German expeditions to Greenland in 1929 and 1930 before losing his life on the ice cap in November of that year.

Mountains of Coats Land